Metasia cyrnealis is a species of moth in the family Crambidae. It is found on Sardinia and Corsica.

References

Moths described in 1926
Metasia
Moths of Europe